The 2007 National Women Football Championship was the third season of the National Women Football Championship, the top-tier of women's football in Pakistan. The tournament took place in August 2007 at Jinnah Sports Stadium in Islamabad.

Lahore's Sports Sciences Women Club won their maiden title by beating the guest team Afghanistan 1-0 in the final.

Teams 
Fourteen teams took part in the tournament.

 Afghanistan (guest team)
 Azad Jammu & Kashmir's Pilot
 Balochistan 
 Diya
 Islamabad
 Wapda
 Sindh 
 Punjab
 Sports Sciences
 Young Rising Star Red
 Lahore Women
 Young Rising Star Blue
 Higher Education Commission
 Mardan

References 

National Women Football Championship seasons